Abbotsfield is a country house and farm, to the west of the town of Wiveliscombe, Somerset, England. Built in 1872, it  became a Grade II listed building a century later on 11 July 1975.

Building
Abbotsfield was a country house built in approximately 1872 for Lacey Collard. Owen Jones designed the building, the last surviving example of his design and it is constructed of red sandstone, dressed with white limestone. The roof is slate from West Somerset. The building's frontage includes a single storey block three bays wide, with a central porch, then a two storey bay to the left. To the right of the main block is a three story staircase tower, with a pyramid roof. In front of the tower is a ballroom wing. Further to the left is a two story service block and stables. The building was subsequently converted into flats. It was designated Grade II listed status on 11 July 1975.

Ownership
The property was purchased by the wealthy Collard family of piano makers in the 1870s. Businessman Charles Lukey Collard built a new Abbotsfield House in 1875, consisting of a row of six cottages to also house his staff, overlooking the town of Wiveliscombe. Collard of Abbotsfield died in 1891 or 1892. In 1927, John Hobart Armstrong, the director of A. Reyrolle & Company, owned Abbotsfield. As of 1939 it was owned by a P. H. John Hancock. In 1959, Country Life described the house as being 13 acres, set in grounds of some 410 acres, describing it as of  "moderate size" with large reception rooms.  In 1979, an Arthur Norton Poyntz Milner was documented to reside at 4 Abbotsfield, Wiveliscombe.

References

Grade II listed buildings in Taunton Deane
Country houses in Somerset
Farmhouses in England
Houses completed in 1875
Wiveliscombe